John Smith & Son is a United Kingdom academic bookseller, based in Ringwood.

Founded in 1751, it is the oldest bookselling company in the English-speaking world. It was based for many years at 57–61 St. Vincent Street in Glasgow, which was also its principal retail outlet. A circulating library (established by Smith as Glasgow's first circulating library and Scotland's second overall) ultimately evolved into the academic bookselling arm of the business. From 1751 its chairmen have been three Smiths, three Knoxes and Robert Clow (1934-2022) who became the first chairman in 2000 of the continuing John Smith Group.

The St. Vincent Street shop, along with the general retail part of the business closed in 2000. However as part of the JS Group it continues to trade as an academic bookseller, with campus outlets including Glasgow University, Strathclyde University and the University of London in the UK as well as overseas.

See also
 Book trade in the United Kingdom
 John Smith, Youngest (1784-1849), and the book trade of Glasgow . PhD thesis of Stephen Hall, 2017

References

Retail companies established in 1751
Companies based in Glasgow
Bookshops of Scotland
Book publishing companies of Scotland
1751 establishments in Great Britain
Publishing companies established in the 1750s